The Roman Catholic Diocese of Valledupar is a diocese located in the city of Valledupar in the Ecclesiastical province of Barranquilla in Colombia.

History
 4 December 1952: Established as Apostolic Vicariate of Valledupar from the Apostolic Vicariate of Goajira
 25 April 1969: Promoted as Diocese of Valledupar

Bishops

Ordinaries
 Vicar Apostolic of Valledupar (Roman rite)
 Bishop Vicente Roig y Villalba, O.F.M. Cap. (1952.12.04 – 1969.04.25)
 Bishops of Valledupar (Roman rite)
 Bishop Vicente Roig y Villalba, O.F.M. Cap. (1969.04.25 – 1977.04.05)
 Bishop José Agustín Valbuena Jáuregui (1977.09.09 – 2003.06.10)
 Bishop Oscar José Vélez Isaza, C.M.F. (2003.06.10 – present)

Other priest of this diocese who became bishop
Pablo Emiro Salas Anteliz, appointed Bishop of Espinal in 2007

See also
Roman Catholicism in Colombia

Sources

External links
 Catholic Hierarchy
 GCatholic.org

Roman Catholic dioceses in Colombia
Roman Catholic Ecclesiastical Province of Barranquilla
Christian organizations established in 1952
Valledupar
Roman Catholic dioceses and prelatures established in the 20th century
1952 establishments in Colombia